DE-CIX Istanbul, is a carrier and data center-neutral Internet exchange point (IX or IXP) in Istanbul, Turkey, founded in 2015 by DE-CIX. It is the only Internet exchange point that connects to both Europe and Asia within the same country.

See also 
 List of Internet exchange points

References 

Internet exchange points in Turkey
Telecommunications in Turkey
Internet in Turkey